Pulkovsky meridian Municipal Okrug is a municipal okrug in Moskovsky District, one of the eighty-one low-level municipal divisions  of the federal city of St. Petersburg, Russia. As of the 2010 Census, its population was 43,259, down from 46,515 recorded during the 2002 Census.

Until August 2008, it was known as Municipal Okrug #47.

References

Notes

Sources

Moskovsky District, Saint Petersburg